Hederopsis is an extinct genus of the enigmatic hederellids.

References 

Protostome enigmatic taxa
Prehistoric protostome genera
Carboniferous invertebrates
Silurian animals
Devonian animals
Late Devonian animals
Permian animals